Mohamedhen Beibou (Arabic: محمدهن بيبو; born 5 December 1995) is a Mauritanian professional footballer who plays as a left-back for Super D1 club Nouadhibou and the Mauritania national team.

Honours 
Nouadhibou

 Super D1: 2017–18, 2018–19, 2019–20, 2020–21
 Mauritanian President's Cup: 2017–18
 Mauritanian Super Cup: 2018

References 

1995 births
Living people
People from Nouakchott
Association football fullbacks
FC Nouadhibou players
Super D1 players
Mauritania international footballers
Mauritanian footballers
Mauritania A' international footballers
2022 African Nations Championship players